Kazi Akbar Uddin Mohammad Siddique (1924-2004) was a Bangladesh Awami League politician and the former Member of Parliament of Comilla-6.

Career
Siddique was elected to parliament from Comilla-6 as a Bangladesh Awami League candidate in 1973.

References

Awami League politicians
1924 births
1st Jatiya Sangsad members
2004 deaths